Gerard Weber may refer to:

 Gerard Weber (footballer, born 1938), Dutch footballer for Excelsior and football manager
 Gerard Weber (footballer, born 1941), Dutch footballer for BVV, DOS, PSV, and EVV
 Gérard Weber (1948–2016), French politician